In enzymology, a bisphosphoglycerate phosphatase is an enzyme that catalyzes the chemical reaction

2,3-bisphospho-D-glycerate + H2O  3-phospho-D-glycerate + phosphate

Thus, the two substrates of this enzyme are 2,3-bisphospho-D-glycerate and H2O, whereas its two products are 3-phospho-D-glycerate and phosphate.

This enzyme belongs to the family of hydrolases, specifically those acting on phosphoric monoester bonds.  The systematic name of this enzyme class is 2,3-bisphospho-D-glycerate 2-phosphohydrolase. Other names in common use include 2,3-diphosphoglycerate phosphatase, diphosphoglycerate phosphatase, 2,3-diphosphoglyceric acid phosphatase, 2,3-bisphosphoglycerate phosphatase, and glycerate-2,3-diphosphate phosphatase.  This enzyme participates in glycolysis/gluconeogenesis.

Structural studies

References

 
 

EC 3.1.3
Enzymes of known structure